Woodward Bay is an Arctic waterway in Qikiqtaaluk Region, Nunavut, Canada. It is located in Nares Strait, off eastern Ellesmere Island.

References

Bays of Qikiqtaaluk Region
Ellesmere Island